The Al-Saffahiyah Mosque is a mosque in Aleppo, located to the south-west of the Citadel, at "Al-Jalloum" district of the ancient city, to the east of Al-Shibani Church-School. The mosque was built in 1425 under the patronage of Ahmed bin Saleh bin Al-Saffah on the ruins of an old mill, during the Mamluk period.

The mosque is marked with its single octagonal minaret over the entrance, decorated with the fine carvings of the Mamluk-era architecture.

The mosque was partially renovated in 1925.

Gallery

References

Mamluk mosques in Syria
Religious buildings and structures completed in 1425
15th-century mosques
Mosques in Aleppo
Mausoleums in Syria
Madrasas in Aleppo